Beverley Tucker Crump (June 10, 1854 – March 29, 1930) was a politician and judge in Virginia.

His father, William Wood Crump, was a lawyer and judge who served as assistant secretary of the treasury for the Confederate States of America. His mother was Mary S. Tabb.

He served in the Virginia Legislature in 1893 and 1894. He was elected a circuit court judge in Richmond in 1902. He married Etta (Henrietta) Ogle Tayloe in 1884. They had three daughters and a son, William Wood Crump (1887 – 1968).

He was president of the Virginia Boat Club in 1894, at the time of its incorporation.

References

External links
 

1854 births
1930 deaths
Members of the Virginia General Assembly
20th-century American judges
19th-century American politicians
20th-century American politicians
Virginia circuit court judges